() is a fictional character in The Legend of Zelda series. She appears in The Legend of Zelda: Skyward Sword and its 2021 remaster The Legend of Zelda: Skyward Sword HD. Fi is a major character in the storyline and is the guide and companion to the protagonist, Link. She is a spirit that inhabits the sword that Link uses during gameplay, which eventually transforms into the Master Sword. Her main function is to provide hints and advice to the player. Fi received a mixed reception from both critics and gamers who considered her repeated interjections to be annoying and excessive. Her dialogue was significantly reduced as part of various improvements to the remastered Skyward Sword HD. She also appears as a playable character in the 2014 spin-off game Hyrule Warriors and as a Spirit in the 2018 fighting game Super Smash Bros. Ultimate.

Concept and creation
Fi was first revealed at E3 2009 in concept art for The Legend of Zelda: Skyward Sword alongside Link. Her original function was different than it is in the final game. The designers created Fi to serve as a counterpart to the silent protagonist in order to provide hints, navigation and storytelling. They used 1980s anime as a source of inspiration for Fi's design. In the Nintendo book titled Hyrule Historia, the designers stated, "we had imagined this a la 1980s anime, in which the main character was usually accompanied by a beautiful personal assistant". They also wanted the character to resemble the Fairy Queen character that appears in The Wind Waker.

Fi is voiced in Skyward Sword and Hyrule Warriors by Ayumi Fujimura.

Characteristics
Fi is a humanoid spirit that resides within a sword called the Goddess Sword, which eventually becomes the Master Sword. According to Hyrule Historia, she was designed to appear aged 13 or 14. She has a metallic appearance and her voice is robotic, which gives the impression that she displays no emotion. She wears a cape, which opens up when she spins. Her appearance is predominantly blue and purple in colour. Beneath her cloak Fi has no arms, though when she dances the cloth moves as though it were her limbs. She wears a blue gem on her chest, a purple miniskirt and leggings. Her feet are bare but she displays no toes. Fi was designed to resemble the sword that she inhabits. The shape of her cloak mimics the design of the sword's crossguard, the pattern on her legs mimics the cross grid pattern on the sword's hilt and her blue and purple colour scheme also reflects the sword's prominent colours. Fi's figure is feminine in appearance but the character is officially genderless. In an interview with Nintendo Official Magazine, producer Eiji Aonuma stated that "Fi is not female".

Appearances
Fi appears in The Legend of Zelda: Skyward Sword and plays an essential role in the gameplay. Like earlier characters, such as Navi, she is a companion and guide for the protagonist, Link. In the storyline, she is a spirit left by the goddess Hylia to help the chosen hero. She leads him to a statue of the goddess Hylia with the intention of leading him to the Goddess Sword, which she intends him to use to defeat the villain Demise. She continues to guide him to various settings to accomplish this, where the Goddess Sword is upgraded into the Master Sword. Link later has to put Fi into an eternal slumber after their adventure is at its end.

Fi is one of several characters from Skyward Sword that appears as a playable character in the 2014 hack and slash game Hyrule Warriors, alongside Link, Zelda, Ghirahim and the Imprisoned.

While Fi does not physically appear in The Legend of Zelda: Breath of the Wild, her character is strongly alluded to in various cutscenes, being referred to as "the voice inside the Sword". Communicating through the Master Sword, Fi tells Princess Zelda to bring the injured Link to the Shrine of Resurrection to save his life. As well, the cutscene that follows completion of the Master Trials DLC sees Link communicate with the voice inside the sword. 

Fi appears in the Super Smash Bros. series. In Super Smash Bros. Ultimate (2018), she appears as a Spirit.

The release of The Legend of Zelda: Skyward Sword HD in 2021 for the Nintendo Switch provided a variety of improvements to the original Wii game design. The help and advice offered by Fi throughout gameplay was reduced and accessed as an optional function. Players are notified of Fi's optional hints using a symbol in the lower left corner and a pulsating glow from Link's sword.

Reception
Since being revealed, Fi has been met with mostly mixed to negative reception. Critics and gamers considered her frequent interjections in gameplay to be annoying, comparing her unfavourably to Navi from Ocarina of Time. Due to her repeated interruptions in the gameplay of Skyward Sword, she has been the subject of various internet memes. She has also been recreated by fans for cosplay.

In a preview of Skyward Sword, Audrey Drake of IGN found her to be a "fun change of pace" compared to Navi and Midna, two other companion characters in The Legend of Zelda series. She found her emotionless manner of speech "endearing". Fellow IGN contributor Richard George found her to be good comic relief due to her lack of understanding of human emotions. Sebastian Haley of Venture Beat similarly enjoyed her, finding her to be the best aspect of Skyward Sword. He felt she was less annoying than previous companion characters and that her dialogue helped fill the void left by Link being a silent protagonist.

Game Informer staff criticized Fi for harming the pace of Skyward Sword and criticized her for not letting players figure things out for themselves. David Roberts of GamesRadar+ referred to her as the "perpetual annoyance" of Skyward Sword, while fellow GamesRadar+ contributor Anthony John Agnello noted the ability to skip Fi's tutorials would have been seen as a drastic improvement for the game. Chris Carter of Destructoid criticized her, noting that her design and role in Skyward Sword were good, but added that he could not stand her interrupting the gameplay as much as she did. He felt that her tutorials were potentially damaging for Skyward Swords dungeons. Keza MacDonald of IGN expressed appreciation for how The Legend of Zelda: A Link Between Worlds lacks characters such as Fi who do not interrupt the gameplay and tell players what to do. Despite finding her interruptions annoying, Chris Schilling of Vice felt that the ability to ignore some of the tutorials made it better than it seemed. He added that the ending scene in which she goes into eternal slumber thanking Link was one of the saddest moments in the series, a sentiment on which Griffin Vacheron of Game Revolution felt similarly. Jess Joho of Killscreen negatively compared Fi to the character Turing from Read Only Memories, criticizing Fi as an "information dumpster" and stating that she was nearly "game-breaking" due to this. John Teti of Gameological criticized Fi as part of an initiative by Nintendo to "condescend and over-explain" to players. Ben "Yahtzee" Croshaw of Zero Punctuation was highly critical of Fi, going as far as to say, "besides a twitchy, enraged badger that points out important quest items by breaking wind at them, I cannot imagine a worse assistant".

Kevin Knezevich of GameSpot welcomed the reduction of Fi's dialogue in Skyward Sword HD by commenting that this "makes her less bothersome and improves the game's overall pacing". Ben Reeves for Game Informer praised the game's improved access to Fi's guidance by noting that she "now offers helpful advice at the press of a button to keep you from getting lost or stuck, which is something I wish I had 10 years ago".

See also
 Characters of The Legend of Zelda

Notes

References

Female characters in video games
Fictional deities and spirits
The Legend of Zelda characters
Nintendo protagonists
Video game characters introduced in 2011
Video game sidekicks